Silvana Arias (born April 7, 1982 in Lima) is a Peruvian actress. She also holds a degree in fashion design.

External links 
Official website of Silvana Arias

Peruvian telenovela actresses
Peruvian soap opera actresses
1982 births
Living people
Actresses from Lima
21st-century Peruvian actresses